Jogajog ( Communication) is a 2015 Bengali film adaptation of Rabindranath Tagore's 1929 novel of the same name directed by Sekhar Das.

Cast 
 Shuvolagna Mukherjee as Kumudini
 Bratya Basu as Madhusudan
 Ananya Chatterjee as Shyamasundari
 Locket Chatterjee as Rimi
 Arjun Chakraborty as Bipradas
 Barun Chanda as Kalu Mukherjee
 Saheb Chatterjee as Nabin
 Saptarshi Roy as Akhil
 Sujoy Prasad Chatterjee as Amulya
 Biswajit Chakraborty
 Lily Chakraborty

Music 

Pandit Debojyoti Bose was chosen to compose the music of Jogajog. Singer Shreya Ghoshal was reported to record a bhajan for the film. Other playback singers for the film include Jayati Chakraborty, Kaushiki Chakrabarty, Arjun Chakraborty and Saheb Chatterjee.

References

External links
 

Films based on works by Rabindranath Tagore
Bengali-language Indian films
2010s Bengali-language films